Nehrim: At Fate's Edge is a total conversion mod of Bethesda Softworks' The Elder Scrolls IV: Oblivion developed by the German team SureAI over the span of four years. It was released in German on June 9, 2010, and subsequently in English on September 11, 2010.

Gameplay
As a total conversion mod, Nehrim completely departs from Oblivion in several regards and redesigns other aspects of the game. Whereas Oblivion featured a fast travel system and enemies which leveled up along with the player, Nehrim removed the fast travel option in favour of a spell-based teleportation system which uses teleportation runes, and has fixed-level enemies to provide the player with a sense of progression in power. Other departures from Oblivion include a traditional XP-based leveling system, instead of Oblivion'''s skill-based leveling approach. Nehrim is also set in a completely different universe than The Elder Scrolls series, with its own races, stories, lore, and so on.

Development
The game was developed by a core team of 12 people, supported by over 50 professional voice actors, and several volunteers for testing and various tasks. It also makes use of previously developed Oblivion mods such as "Ren's Beauty Pack" which improves the appearance of non-player characters and "Qarl's Texture Pack" which allows for the use of high-resolution textures. Nehrim received a Steam release on June 10, 2020, with achievement support.

ReceptionPC PowerPlay reviewed the game and gave it a 9 out of 10, remarking "Nehrim isn't merely a mod; it's the watermark for whatever Bethesda has planned for The Elder Scrolls V to surpass."Nehrim received Mod DB's "Best Singleplayer Mod" for 2010. It also was nominated for their "Best Upcoming Mod" in 2008.  PC Gamer US also awarded Nehrim as the "Mod of the Year" for 2010. GameFront'' picked it in their selection of "Best Mods of the Year" for 2010, along with seven other mods.

References

External links
Nehrim – At Fate's Edge website 

The Elder Scrolls mods
Role-playing video games
Video games developed in Germany
Windows games
Windows-only games
Action role-playing video games
2010 video games

fi:The Elder Scrolls IV: Oblivion#Nehrim: At Fate’s Edge